The Emirate of Transjordan, officially known as the Amirate of Trans-Jordan, was a British protectorate established on 11 April 1921, which remained as such until achieving formal independence in 1946.

After the Ottoman defeat in World War I, the Transjordan region was administered within OETA East; after the British withdrawal in 1919, this region gained de facto recognition as part of the Hashemite-ruled Arab Kingdom of Syria, administering an area broadly comprising the areas of the modern countries of Syria and Jordan. Transjordan became a no man's land following the July 1920 Battle of Maysalun, during which period the British in neighbouring Mandatory Palestine chose to avoid "any definite connection between it and Palestine". Abdullah entered the region in November 1920, moving to Amman on 2 March 1921; later in the month a conference was held with the British during which it was agreed that Abdullah bin Hussein would administer the territory under the auspices of the British Mandate for Palestine with a fully autonomous governing system.

The Hashemite dynasty ruled the protectorate, as well as the neighbouring Mandatory Iraq and, until 1925, the Kingdom of Hejaz to the south. On 25 May 1946, the emirate became the "Hashemite Kingdom of Transjordan", achieving full independence on 17 June 1946 when in accordance with the Treaty of London ratifications were exchanged in Amman. In 1949, it was constitutionally renamed the "Hashemite Kingdom of Jordan", commonly referred to as Jordan.

Background

Relevant British agreements

From July 1915 to March 1916, a series of ten letters were exchanged between Hussein bin Ali, Sharif of Mecca, and Lieutenant Colonel Sir Henry McMahon, British High Commissioner to Egypt. In the letters – particularly that of 24 October 1915 – the British government agreed to recognize Arab independence after the war in exchange for the Sharif of Mecca launching the Arab Revolt against the Ottoman Empire. The area of Arab independence was defined to be "in the limits and boundaries proposed by the Sherif of Mecca", with the exception of "portions of Syria" lying to the west of "the districts of Damascus, Homs, Hama and Aleppo"; conflicting interpretations of this description was to cause great controversy in subsequent years.

Around the same time, another secret treaty was negotiated between the United Kingdom and France, with assent from the Russian Empire and Italy, to define their mutually agreed spheres of influence and control in an eventual partition of the Ottoman Empire. The primary negotiations leading to the agreement occurred between 23 November 1915 and 3 January 1916, on which date the British and French diplomats, Mark Sykes and François Georges-Picot, initialled an agreed memorandum. The agreement was ratified by their respective governments on 9 and 16 May 1916. The agreement allocated to Britain control of what is today southern Israel and Palestine, Jordan and southern Iraq, and an additional small area that included the ports of Haifa and Acre to allow access to the Mediterranean. The Palestine region, with smaller boundaries than the later Mandatory Palestine, was to fall under an "international administration". The agreement was initially used directly as the basis for the 1918 Anglo–French Modus Vivendi which agreed on a framework for the Occupied Enemy Territory Administration in the Levant. Shortly after the war, the French ceded Palestine and Mosul to the British. The geographical area that was later to become Transjordan was allocated to Britain.

Late Ottoman rule

Under the Ottoman Empire, most of Transjordan was part of the Syria Vilayet, primarily the sanjaks of Hauran and Ma'an. The inhabitants of northern Transjordan had traditionally associated with Syria, and those of southern Transjordan with the Arabian Peninsula. There was no Ottoman district known as Transjordan, there were the districts Ajlun, al-Balqa, al-Karak and Ma'an.
In the second half of the nineteenth century, The Tanzimat laid the foundation for state formation in the area. 
The Hejaz railway was completed in 1908 and greatly facilitated the Hajj pilgrimage along the Syrian route from Damascus as well as extending the Ottoman military and administrative reach southwards.

Establishment of the Emirate

Arab Revolt and Kingdom of Syria
During World War I, Transjordan saw much of the fighting of the Arab Revolt against Ottoman rule. Assisted by the British army officer T. E. Lawrence, the Sharif of Mecca Hussein bin Ali led the successful revolt which contributed to the Ottoman defeat and breaking up of its empire. Ottoman forces were forced to withdraw from Aqaba in 1917 after the Battle of Aqaba. In 1918 the British Foreign Office noted the Arab position East of the Jordan, Biger wrote: "At the beginning of 1918, soon after the southern part of Palestine was conquered, the Foreign Office determined that Faisal’s authority over the area that he controls on the Eastern side of the Jordan river should be recognized. We can confirm this recognition of ours even if our forces do not currently control major parts of Transjordan.’"
In March 1920, the Hashemite Kingdom of Syria was declared by Faisal bin Hussein in Damascus which encompassed most of what later became Transjordan. At this point, the sparsely inhabited southern part of Transjordan was claimed by both Faisal's Syria and his father's Kingdom of Hejaz. Following the provision of mandate to France and Britain at the San Remo conference in April, the British appointed Sir Herbert Samuel High Commissioner in Palestine from 1 July 1920 with a remit over the area west of the Jordan.

The path to an Emirate

After the French ended the Kingdom of Syria at the battle of Maysalun, Transjordan became, for a short time, a no man's land or, as Samuel put it, "..left politically derelict".
In August 1920, Sir Herbert Samuel's request to extend the frontier of British territory beyond the River Jordan and to bring Transjordan under his administrative control was rejected. The British Foreign Secretary, Lord Curzon, proposed instead that British influence in Transjordan should be advanced by sending a few political officers, without military escort, to encourage self-government and give advice to local leaders in the territory. Following Curzon's instruction Samuel set up a meeting with Transjordanian leaders where he presented British plans for the territory. The local leaders were reassured that Transjordan would not come under Palestinian administration and that there would be no disarmament or conscription. Samuel's terms were accepted, he returned to Jerusalem, leaving Captain Alec Kirkbride as the British representative east of the Jordan until the arrival on 21 November 1920 of Abdullah, the brother of recently deposed king Faisal, marched into Ma'an at the head of an army of 300 men from the Hejazi tribe of 'Utaybah. Without facing opposition Abdullah and his army had effectively occupied most of Transjordan by March 1921.

Relationship with Palestine

In early 1921, prior to the convening of the Cairo Conference, the Middle East Department of the Colonial Office set out the situation as follows:
Distinction to be drawn between Palestine and Trans-Jordan under the Mandate. His Majesty's Government are responsible under the terms of the Mandate for establishing in Palestine a national home for the Jewish people. They are also pledged by the assurances given to the Sherif of Mecca in 1915 to recognise and support the independence of the Arabs in those portions of the (Turkish) vilayet of Damascus in which they are free to act without detriment to French interests. The western boundary of the Turkish vilayet of Damascus before the war was the River Jordan. Palestine and Trans-Jordan do not, therefore, stand upon quite the same footing. At the same time, the two areas are economically interdependent, and their development must be considered as a single problem. Further, His Majesty's Government have been entrusted with the Mandate for "Palestine". If they wish to assert their claim to Trans-Jordan and to avoid raising with other Powers the legal status of that area, they can only do so by proceeding upon the assumption that Trans-Jordan forms part of the area covered by the Palestine Mandate. In default of this assumption Trans-Jordan would be left, under article 132 of the Treaty of Sèvres, to the disposal of the principal Allied Powers. Some means must be found of giving effect in Trans-Jordan to the terms of the Mandate consistently with "recognition and support of the independence of the Arabs".

The Cairo Conference of March 1921 was convened by Winston Churchill, then Britain's Colonial Secretary. With the mandates of Palestine and Iraq awarded to Britain, Churchill wished to consult with Middle East experts. At his request, Gertrude Bell, Sir Percy Cox, T. E. Lawrence, Sir Kinahan Cornwallis, Sir Arnold T. Wilson, Iraqi minister of war Jaʿfar alAskari, Iraqi minister of finance Sasun Effendi (Sasson Heskayl), and others gathered in Cairo, Egypt. An additional outstanding question was the policy to be adopted in Transjordan to prevent anti-French military actions from being launched within the allied British zone of influence. The Hashemites were Associated Powers during the war, and a peaceful solution was urgently needed. The two most significant decisions of the conference were to offer the throne of Iraq to emir Faisal ibn Hussein (who became Faisal I of Iraq) and an emirate of Transjordan (now Jordan) to his brother Abdullah ibn Hussein (who became Abdullah I of Jordan). The conference provided the political blueprint for British administration in both Iraq and Transjordan, and in offering these two regions to the sons of Hussein bin Ali, Churchill stated that the spirit, if not the letter, of Britain's wartime promises to the Arabs might be fulfilled. After further discussions between Churchill and Abdullah in Jerusalem, it was mutually agreed that Transjordan was accepted into the Palestine mandatory area as an Arab country apart from Palestine with the proviso that it would be, initially for six months, under the nominal rule of the emir Abdullah and that it would not form part of the Jewish national home to be established west of the River Jordan. Abdullah was then appointed Emir of the Transjordania region in April 1921.

On 21 March 1921, the Foreign and Colonial office legal advisers decided to introduce Article 25 into the Mandate for Palestine, which brought Transjordan under the Palestine mandate and stated that in that territory, Britain could 'postpone or withhold' those articles of the Mandate concerning a Jewish national home. It was approved by Curzon on 31 March 1921, and the revised final draft of the mandate (including Transjordan) was forwarded to the League of Nations on 22 July 1922. In August 1922, the British government presented a memorandum to the League of Nations stating that Transjordan would be excluded from all the provisions dealing with Jewish settlement, and this memorandum was approved by the League on 12 August.

Establishment
Abdullah established his government on 11 April 1921. Britain administered the part west of the Jordan as Palestine, and the part east of the Jordan as Transjordan. Technically they remained one mandate, but most official documents referred to them as if they were two separate mandates. The Palestine Order in Council, 1922, which established the legal basis for the Mandatory Government in Palestine, explicitly excluded Transjordan from its application apart from giving the High Commissioner some discretionary power there. In April/May 1923 Transjordan was granted a degree of independence with Abdullah as ruler and St John Philby as chief representative.

The Hashemite emir Abdullah, elder son of Britain's wartime Arab ally Hussein bin Ali, was placed on the throne of Transjordan. The applicable parts of the Mandate for Palestine were stated in a decision of 16 September 1922, which provided for the separate administration of Transjordan. The government of the territory was, subject to the mandate, formed by Abdullah, brother of King Faisal I of Iraq, who had been at Amman since February 1921. Britain recognized Transjordan as an independent government on 15 May 1923, and gradually relinquished control, limiting its oversight to financial, military and foreign policy matters. This affected the goals of Revisionist Zionism, which sought a state on both banks of the Jordan. The movement claimed that it effectively severed Transjordan from Palestine, and so reduced the area on which a future Jewish state in the region could be established.

Borders
The southern border between Transjordan and Arabia was considered strategic for Transjordan in order to avoid being landlocked, with intended access to the sea via the Port of Aqaba. The southern region of Ma'an-Aqaba, a large area with a small population of just 10,000, was administered by OETA East (later the Arab Kingdom of Syria, and then Mandatory Transjordan) and claimed by the Kingdom of Hejaz. In OETA East, Faisal had appointed a kaymakam (or sub-governor) at Ma'an, whereas the kaymakam at Aqaba, who "disregarded both Husein in Mecca and Feisal in Damascus with impunity" had been instructed by Hussein to extend his authority to Ma'an. This technical dispute did not rise to any form of open struggle, and the Kingdom of Hejaz was to take de facto control after Faisal's administration was defeated by the French. Following the 1924–25 Saudi conquest of Hejaz, Hussein's army fled to the Ma'an region, which was then formally announced as annexed by Abdullah's Transjordan. Ibn Saud privately agreed to respect this position in an exchange of letters at the time of the 1927 Treaty of Jeddah.

The Negev region was added to Palestine on 10 July 1922, having been conceded by British representative John Philby "in Trans-Jordan's name". Abdullah made a request for the Negev to be added to Transjordan in late 1922, and again in 1925, but this was rejected.

The location of the Eastern border between Transjordan and Iraq was considered strategic with respect to the proposed construction of what became the Kirkuk–Haifa oil pipeline. It was first set out on 2 December 1922, in a treaty to which Transjordan was not party to – the Uqair Protocol between Iraq and Nejd. It described the western end of the Iraq-Nejd boundary as "the Jebel Anazan situated in the neighbourhood of the intersection of latitude 32 degrees north longitude 39 degrees east where the Iraq-Najd boundary terminated", thereby implicitly confirming this as the point at which the Iraq-Nejd boundary became the Transjordan-Nejd boundary. This followed a proposal from Lawrence in January 1922 that Transjordan be extended to include Wadi Sirhan as far south as al-Jauf, in order to protect Britain's route to India and contain Ibn Saud.

France transferred the District of Ramtha from Syria in 1921.

Population

With respect to the demographics, in 1924 the British stated: "No census of the population has been taken, but the figure is thought to be in the neighbourhood of 200,000, of whom some 10,000 are Circassians and Chechen; there are about 15,000 Christians and the remainder, in the main, are Moslem Arabs." No census was taken throughout the British mandate period, but the population was estimated to have grown to 300,000 – 350,000 by the early 1940s.

Defense
The most serious threats to Abdullah's position in Transjordan were repeated Wahhabi incursions by the Ikhwan tribesmen from Najd in modern Saudi Arabia into southern parts of his territory. The emir was powerless to repel those raids by himself, and had to appeal for help to the British who maintained a military base with a small air force at Marka, close to Amman. The British military force was the primary obstacle against the Ikhwan between 1922 and 1924, and was also utilized to help Abdullah with the suppression of local rebellions at Kura, and later by Sultan Adwan, in 1921 and 1923 respectively.

Establishment of the kingdom

Transfer of authority to an Arab government took place gradually in Transjordan, starting with Abdullah's appointment as Emir of Transjordan on 1 April 1921, and the formation of his first government on 11 April 1921. The independent administration was recognised in a statement made public (the statement had been agreed in October 1922 following the approval of the revised Mandate on 16 September 1922 with publication made conditional on completion of a probationary period) in Amman on 25 May 1923: "Subject to the approval of the League of Nations, His Britannic Majesty will recognise the existence of an independent Government in Trans-jordan under the rule of His Highness the Amir Abdullah, provided that such Government is constitutional and places His Britannic Majesty in a position to fulfil his international obligations in respect of the territory by means of an Agreement to be concluded with His Highness"

During the eleventh session of the League of Nations' Permanent Mandates Commission in 1927, Sir John E. Shuckburgh summarised the status of Transjordan:
It is not part of Palestine but it is part of the area administered by the British Government under the authority of the Palestine Mandate. The special arrangements there really go back to the old controversy about our war time pledges to the Arabs which I have no wish to revive. The point is that on our own interpretation of those pledges the country East of the Jordan – though not the country West of the Jordan – falls within the area in respect of which we promised during the war to recognise and support the independence of the Arabs. Transjordan is in a wholly different position from Palestine and it was considered necessary that special arrangements should be made there

1928 treaty
Transfer of most administrative functions occurred in 1928, including the creation of the post of High Commissioner for Transjordan. The status of the mandate was not altered by the agreement between the United Kingdom and the Emirate concluded on 20 February 1928. It recognised the existence of an independent government in Transjordan and defined and limited its powers. The ratifications were exchanged on 31 October 1929."

Transjordan remained under British control until the first-Transjordanian treaty was concluded in 1928. Transjordan became nominally independent, although the British still maintained a military presence and control of foreign affairs and retained some financial control over the Emirate. This failed to respond to Transjordanian demands for a fully sovereign and independent state, a failure that led to widespread disaffection with the treaty among Transjordanians, prompting them to seek a national conference (25 July 1928), the first of its kind, to examine the articles of the treaty and adopt a plan of political action.

According to the U.S. State Department Digest of International Law, the status of the mandate was not altered by the agreement between the United Kingdom and the Emirate concluded on 20 February 1928 which recognized the existence of an independent government in Transjordan and defined and limited its powers. The ratifications were exchanged on 31 October 1929."

1946 independence

On 17 January 1946, Ernest Bevin, the British Foreign Secretary, announced in a speech at the General Assembly of the United Nations that the British Government intended to take steps in the near future to establish Transjordan as a fully independent and sovereign state. The Treaty of London was signed by the British Government and the Emir of Transjordan on 22 March 1946 as a mechanism to recognise the full independence of Transjordan upon ratification by both countries parliaments. Transjordan's impending independence was recognized on 18 April 1946 by the League of Nations during the last meeting of that organization. On 25 May 1946 the Transjordan became the "Hashemite Kingdom of Transjordan" when the ruling 'Amir' was re-designated as 'King' by the parliament of Transjordan on the day it ratified the Treaty of London. 25 May is still celebrated as independence day in Jordan although officially the mandate for Transjordan ended on 17 June 1946 when in accordance with the Treaty of London the ratifications were exchanged in Amman and Transjordan gained full independence. In 1949 the country's official name was changed to the "Hashemite Kingdom of Jordan".

When King Abdullah applied for membership in the newly formed United Nations, his request was vetoed by the Soviet Union, citing that the nation was not "fully independent" of British control. This resulted in another treaty in March 1948 with Britain in which all restrictions on sovereignty were removed. Despite this, Jordan was not a full member of the United Nations until 14 December 1955.
The Anglo-American treaty, also known as the Palestine Mandate Convention, permitted the US to delay any unilateral British action to terminate the mandate. The earlier proclamation of the independence of Syria and Lebanon had said "the independence and sovereignty of Syria and Lebanon will not affect the juridical situation as it results from the Mandate Act. Indeed, this situation could be changed only with the agreement of the Council of the League of Nations, with the consent of the Government of the United States, a signatory of the Franco-American Convention of 4 April 1924".

The U.S. adopted the policy that formal termination of the mandate with respect to Transjordan would follow the earlier precedent established by the French Mandate for Syria and the Lebanon. That meant termination would generally be recognized upon the admission of Transjordan into the United Nations as a fully independent country. Members of the U.S. Congress introduced resolutions demanding that the U.S. Representative to the United Nations be instructed to seek postponement of any international determination of the status of Transjordan until the future status of Palestine as a whole was determined. The U.S. State Department also received a legal argument from Rabbis Wise and Silver objecting to the independence of Transjordan. At the 1947 Pentagon Conference, the U.S. advised Great Britain it was withholding recognition of Transjordan pending a decision on the Palestine question by the United Nations.

Transjordan applied for membership of the United Nations on 26 June 1946. The Polish representative said that he did not object to the independence of Transjordan, but requested that the application be postponed for a year on the grounds that legal procedures required by the Covenant of the League of Nations had not been carried out. The British representative responded that the League of Nations had already approved the termination of the mandate in Transjordan. When the issue was voted on, Transjordan's application achieved the required total number of votes, but was vetoed by the Soviet Union which did not approve membership of any countries with which it did not have diplomatic relations. This problem and similar problems caused by vetoes of the memberships of Ireland, Portugal, Austria, Finland and Italy took several years and many votes to solve. Jordan was finally admitted to membership on 14 December 1955.

See also

 Oultrejordain
 Transjordan (region)

Notes

References

Bibliography

Cited sources

General references

External links
 Jordan – History: The making of Transjordan, King Hussein's official page
 U.S. Library of Congress country study

 
Modern history of Jordan
League of Nations mandates
Transjordan, Emirate of
Transjordan, Emirate of
1921 establishments in Transjordan
1946 disestablishments in Jordan
1920s in Transjordan
1930s in Transjordan
1940s in Jordan
Transjordan
Transjordan, Emirate of
Former countries of the interwar period
Transjordan (region)